Mary Beaumont may refer to:

 Mary Lawson (actress) (1910–1941), English stage and film actress, married name Beaumont
 Mary Beaumont (author) (1849–1910), Victorian author
 Mary Beaumont (died 1632), created Mary Villiers, Countess of Buckingham in her own right
Mary Beaumont Welch (1841–1923), American educator and suffragist